The HWA Television Championship was a title contested in the Heartland Wrestling Association.  It was introduced on January 6, 2004 when the HWA Cruiserweight Championship was renamed.  Quinten Lee was made the HWA Television Championship as he was the then HWA Cruiserweight Champion. Granger was the final champion as the title was retired on August 30, 2008 when the HWA Cruiserweight Championship was re-activated.

Title history

Combined reigns

See also
Heartland Wrestling Association

References

Heartland Wrestling Association championships
Television wrestling championships